The Niagara Ice Hockey Club were an early ice hockey team in the United Kingdom. They played at the Niagara Ice Rink, York Street (now called Petty France), close to St James's Park tube station in London. Contemporary accounts of the early history of British ice hockey refer to Niagara being the first English club champions in 1898.

Notes

References

Further reading

Ice hockey teams in London
Defunct ice hockey teams in the United Kingdom